Boutersem is a municipality located in the Belgian province of Flemish Brabant. The municipality now comprises the towns of Boutersem proper, Kerkom, Neervelp, Roosbeek, Vertrijk and Willebringen. On January 1, 2006, Boutersem had a total population of 7,532. The total area is 30.75 km² which gives a population density of 245 inhabitants per km².

References

External links
 
 Gazetteer Entry

Municipalities of Flemish Brabant